The list of National Historic Landmarks in Wyoming contains the landmarks designated by the U.S. Federal Government located in the U.S. state of Wyoming.
There are 27 National Historic Landmarks (NHLs) in Wyoming.
The first designated were two on December 19, 1960;  the latest was on December 23, 2016.

|}

See also

Historic preservation

List of National Historic Landmarks by state
National Register of Historic Places listings in Wyoming

References

External links

 National Historic Landmark Program at the National Park Service
 Lists of National Historic Landmarks

Wyoming
 
National Historic Landmarks
National Historic Landmarks